The Arctomys Formation is a stratigraphic unit of late Middle Cambrian age. It is present on the western edge of the Western Canada Sedimentary Basin in the Canadian Rockies of Alberta and British Columbia.  It was named for Arctomys Peak near Mount Erasmus in Banff National Park by Charles Doolittle Walcott in 1920. Outcrops of the Arctomys can be seen in Banff and Jasper National Parks.

Lithology and deposition
The Arctomys was deposited along the western shoreline of the North American Craton during late Middle Cambrian time. It consists primarily of red, grey, and green platy shale. Sedimentary structures include mudcracks, ripple marks, and casts of salt crystals. Environments of deposition may have included shallow lakes, lagoons, and sheet-flood deposits on dry mud flats.

Distribution and stratigraphic relationships
The Arctomys Formation is present in the Rocky Mountains of Alberta and British Columbia. It thickens northward from White Man Mountain to a maximum of 336 metres (1,100 ft) at Mount Robson. It is overlies the Pika Formation and is overlain by the Waterfowl Formation. Both contacts are gradational.

References

Cambrian Alberta
Cambrian British Columbia
Cambrian System of North America
Western Canadian Sedimentary Basin
Geologic formations of Alberta
Geologic formations of Canada
Stratigraphy of British Columbia